The Norton ES2 is a Norton motorcycle produced from 1927 until 1964. From 1965, a different machine  was produced for a short time by parent manufacturer AMC, based on a Matchless but badged as Norton ES2 Mk2.

Development

It was a long stroke single, always 79mm × 100mm bore and stroke, originally launched as a sports motorcycle but throughout its long life it was gradually overtaken by more powerful models.  

It remained popular due to its reliability and ease of maintenance, as well as the traditional design. From 1947 the ES2 had an innovative hydraulically damped telescopic front fork and race developed rear plunger suspension. From 1953 it had a single downtube swinging-arm frame.

Featherbed frame
From 1959 it used the Rex McCandless-designed featherbed frame, with upgrades including an improved AMC gearbox, revised cylinder head, crankshaft-mounted Lucas RM15 60-watt alternator with coil ignition and an 8-inch front brake with full width hubs front and rear. The wideline Featherbed-framed bike was road tested in The Motor Cycle 4 June 1959 issue and was reported to have a mean top speed of 82 mph with petrol consumption of 56 mpg at 60 mph.

Slimline featherbed frame
For 1961, in common with other large-engined Nortons, the bike was further improved with the Slimline frame with upper frame rails narrowed and a restyled slimmer fuel tank.

Finale

The last ES2 was introduced in late 1964. A Matchless-based machine with Norton badges, it was produced for two years before final discontinuation, coincident with the commercial failure of the AMC Group.

A report in a 1980 UK magazine stated:The slow but immensely likeable Featherbed-framed 350 Model 50 and 500 ES2 Norton ohv singles were dropped and in their place appeared the Model 50 MkII and ES2 MkII, or, with Norton badges hastily tacked on the side, the Matchless G3 and G80. They failed to fool anyone, let alone the buying public. In 1966 the heavyweight singles were all but a memory...

References

Bibliography
 Bacon, Roy, (1983). Norton singles: Manx and Inter, and all side and overhead valve singles from 1927 to 1966. Oxford: Osprey Publishing. 
Williams, P, & Reddihough, JA (1960). Motor Cycle Data Book: Motor Cycles, Scooters, Mopeds, Light Cars. London: George Newnes Ltd.

See also
Norton Model 50
List of motorcycles of the 1920s

Motorcycles introduced in the 1920s
ES2
Single-cylinder motorcycles